Mia Marianne och Per Filip is a Swedish Christian music duo consisting of Mia Marianne Waldenstad and Per Filip Waldenstad. They have scored album chart successes in Sweden.

References

Swedish musical groups
Christian musical groups